Horaga moulmeina, the yellow onyx, is a subspecies of Horaga syrinx. It is a small lycaenid  (hairstreak butterfly) found in Asia.

See also
List of butterflies of India
List of butterflies of India (Lycaenidae)

Cited references

Bibliography
 
 
 
 

Horaga
Fauna of Pakistan
Butterflies described in 1883